Maria Vitalievna Politseymako (born 10 February 1938) is a Soviet and Russian theater and film actress, an Honored Artist of the RSFSR.  She is an actress of  Taganka Theatre.

Family
Maria Politseymako is a daughter of a famous Tovstonogov Bolshoi Drama Theater .
She is the widow of the actor of theater Semyon Farada, her son is the actor and TV presenter .

References

External links
 Марина Полицеймако на сайте Театра на Таганке
 
  Интервью журналу «Театрал»

1938 births
Living people
Soviet film actresses
Soviet stage actresses
Honored Artists of the RSFSR
Russian film actresses
Russian stage actresses
20th-century Russian actresses
21st-century Russian actresses